

2001–2009 
"Okay, just wondering."
— Dale Earnhardt Sr., American race car driver (18 February 2001), after asking teammate Andy Pilgrim if he had any advice for him prior to his fatal crash in the 2001 Daytona 500

"It matters not how strait the gate, How charged with punishments the scroll, I am the master of my fate: I am the captain of my soul."
— Timothy McVeigh, American domestic terrorist (11 June 2001). Convicted of the Oklahoma City bombing, McVeigh chose "Invictus" (Latin for "unconquered"), an 1875 poem by the British poet William Ernest Henley, as his final statement prior to his execution by lethal injection.

"No. Somebody's calling medical and we can't get a doc—"
— Betty Ong, a flight attendant aboard American Airlines Flight 11 (11 September 2001), on a phone call, in response to Operations Specialist Nydia Gonzalez asking if she had tried calling anyone else for help treating the stab victims on the plane.

"I see water. I see buildings. I see buildings! We are flying low. We are flying very, very low. We are flying way too low. Oh my God we are flying way too low. Oh my God!"
— Madeline Amy Sweeney, flight attendant aboard American Airlines Flight 11 (11 September 2001), over the phone to manager Michael Woodward

"Are you guys ready? Let's roll."
— Todd Beamer, American passenger on United Airlines Flight 93 (11 September 2001), signaling the start of the revolt against the flight's hijackers, resulting in the plane crashing in the ensuing struggle for the controls, killing all 44 aboard

"We're going to rush the hijackers."
— Jeremy Glick, American passenger on United Airlines Flight 93 (11 September 2001), over the phone to his wife prior to the revolt against the flight's hijackers

"We're looking in... We're overlooking the Financial Center. Three of us... Two broken windows... OH GOD! OH—"
— Kevin Cosgrove, a businessman employed at the South tower of the World Trade Center (11 September 2001), over the phone to a 911 dispatcher, who he called from the 105th floor. His last words were uttered when the South tower collapsed, taking him along with it.

"I will never die."
()
— Mona Fandey, Malaysian pop singer, bomoh and murderer (2 November 2001), prior to execution by hanging

"Love one another."
— George Harrison, English musician and songwriter (29 November 2001), to his wife, Olivia Harrison, and son, Dhani Harrison

"Carol, I am so sorry for this. I feel I just can't go on. I have always tried to do the right thing but where there was once great pride now it's gone. I love you and the children so much. I just can't be any good to you or myself. The pain is overwhelming. Please try to forgive me. Cliff—J. Clifford Baxter."
— J. Clifford Baxter, Enron executive (25 January 2002); his suicide note, addressed to his wife. Baxter had been slated to testify before United States congressional committees concerning the Enron scandal.

"That's enough for today, Mr. Heise!"
()
— Robert Steinhäuser, German student and perpetrator of the Erfurt school massacre (26 April 2002), said to a teacher prior to committing suicide

"Yes, I would just like to say I'm sailing with the rock, and I'll be back, like Independence Day, with Jesus. June 6, like the movie. Big mother ship and all, I'll be back, I'll be back."
— Aileen Wuornos, American prostitute and serial killer (9 October 2002), prior to execution by lethal injection

"It was the food!"
— Richard Harris, Irish actor and singer (25 October 2002), while being wheeled out of the Savoy Hotel

"I die with the conviction, held since 1968 and Catonsville, that nuclear weapons are the scourge of the earth; to mine for them, manufacture them, deploy them, use them, is a curse against God, the human family, and the earth itself."
— Philip Berrigan, American peace activist and former Roman Catholic priest (6 December 2002); final statement dictated to his wife, Elizabeth McAlister

"I told u I was hardcore [...] u are so fucking stupid"
— Brandon Vedas (also known by his nickname ripper on IRC), American computer enthusiast, recreational drug user and member of the Shroomery.org community (12 January 2003), who died of a multiple drug overdose while discussing what he was doing via IRC chat and webcam. "I told u I was hardcore" was one of the last things Vedas typed, a phrase often quoted sarcastically on Internet message boards and discussion sites.

"Help me, help me."
— Stephen Oake, QGM, Greater Manchester Police counter-terrorism detective (14 January 2003), while being stabbed in the chest by Algerian illegal immigrant Kamel Bourgass

"Roger, uh, bu-"
— Rick Husband, American astronaut (1 February 2003), final transmission received prior to the disintegration of Space Shuttle Columbia during reentry

"Channel 5 is all shit, isn't it? Christ, the crap they put on there. It's a waste of space."
— Adam Faith, English singer and actor (8 March 2003)

"Depression! Many thanks to all my friends. Many thanks to Professor Felice Lieh-Mak (Cheung's last psychiatrist). This year has been so tough. I can't stand it anymore. Many thanks to Tong Tong (nickname for Cheung's boyfriend Daffy Tong). Many thanks to my family. Many thanks to Sister Fei. In my life I have done nothing bad. Why does it have to be like this?"
()
— Leslie Cheung, Hong Kong singer and actor (1 April 2003), on his suicide note, before leaping from the 24th floor of the Mandarin Oriental hotel in Hong Kong.
"Leave me alone, I'm fine."
— Barry White, American singer and songwriter (4 July 2003), to a nurse

"Surprise me."
— Bob Hope, American actor and comedian (27 July 2003), on being asked by his wife, Dolores Hope, where he wanted to be buried

"I should have been a concert pianist."
— Edward Teller, Hungarian-American physicist (9 September 2003)

"It's time."
— Johnny Cash, American singer-songwriter (12 September 2003), responding to his physical therapist after being unable to complete any of his therapy for the day due to his extremely poor health. Later that day he was rushed to the hospital where he died after his health suddenly plummeted.

"I'd like to thank the Academy for my lifetime achievement award that I will eventually get."
— Donald O'Connor, American actor, dancer and singer (27 September 2003), spoken to his family at his bedside

"Jeb. Just remember, whatever happens, happens."
— Dwain Weston, Australian BASE jumper (5 October 2003), to fellow skydiver Jeb Corliss prior to fatal wingsuit flight over the Royal Gorge Bridge, during which he struck the bridge while flying at 

"Thank you."
— Ricardo Alfonso Cerna, Guatemalan criminal (19 December 2003), to a police officer who gave him a bottle of water, seconds before committing suicide with his .45-caliber handgun, which he had concealed within his clothing

"Now I'll show you how an Italian dies!"
()
— Fabrizio Quattrocchi, Italian security officer (14 April 2004), to Islamist militant kidnappers in Iraq forcing him to dig his own grave while wearing a hood. Quattrocchi tried to pull the hood off and shouted his last words, and was then shot in the neck.

"What are you shooting at?! I'm Pat Tillman! I'm Pat fucking TILLMAN!"
— Pat Tillman, American football player and Army Ranger (22 April 2004), while being fatally wounded by friendly fire in Afghanistan

"My name is Nick Berg, my father's name is Michael, my mother's name is Suzanne. I have a brother and sister, David and Sara. I live in West Chester, Pennsylvania, near Philadelphia."
— Nick Berg, American radio tower repairman (7 May 2004), on video before beheading by Islamist militants

"I jumped near the entrance to the dam."
— Jonathan Aurthur, American wetlands advocate and author ( 22 November 2004); his suicide note, found in his car after he jumped to his death in Angeles National Forest

"Van Halen!"
— Dimebag Darrell (8 December 2004), American guitarist shot on stage while performing with his new band "Damageplan"

"I look forward to taking that off."
— Dave Shaw, Australian commercial aviator and technical diver (8 January 2005), referring to his dive mask at beginning of fatal dive to recover body of Deon Dreyer

"Blessed are the poor in spirit ..."
— Dorothy Stang, American-Brazilian nun and activist (12 February 2005), moments before she was shot to death

"Football Season Is Over. No More Games. No More Bombs. No More Walking. No More Fun. No More Swimming. 67. That is 17 years past 50. 17 more than I needed or wanted. Boring. I am always bitchy. No Fun – for anybody. 67. You are getting Greedy. Act your old age. Relax – This won't hurt."
— Hunter S. Thompson, American journalist and author (20 February 2005), in his suicide note, written four days before his death

"Logan Ambulance One base turn complete."
— Guy Henderson, Scottish pilot (15 March 2005); final radio transmission prior to air ambulance crashing off the coast of Scotland, killing Henderson and paramedic John Keith McCreanor

"Let me go to the house of the Father."
()
— Pope John Paul II (2 April 2005)

"You're a lifesaver, Andy."
— William Donaldson, British satirist and playboy (22 June 2005), to the caretaker of his building, who had collected pills for him

"Roger that, sir. Thank you."
— Michael P. Murphy, United States Navy SEAL and Medal of Honor recipient (28 June 2005), ending a radio call for help after being shot during Operation Red Wings

"Don't die like I did."
— George Best, Northern Irish football player (25 November 2005), dying as an indirect result of alcoholism

"My last words will be 'Hoka Hey, it's a good day to die.' Thank you very much. I love you all. Goodbye."
— Clarence Ray Allen, American criminal (17 January 2006); statement written prior to execution by lethal injection

"Atlanta, this is seven niner x-ray, I'd like to deviate south weather."
— Albert Scott Crossfield, American test pilot (19 April 2006); final radio transmission before dying in crash of Cessna 210A at age 84

"My name is David Sharp. I'm with Asian Trekking, and I just want to sleep."
— David Sharp, English mountaineer (15 May 2006), to a group of Sherpas while dying near the summit of Mount Everest

"I've made peace with God; tell my family that I love them."
— Jared C. Monti, United States Army soldier and Medal of Honor recipient (21 June 2006), mortally wounded by rocket-propelled grenade in Afghanistan

"I'm dying."
— Steve Irwin, Australian conservationist (4 September 2006), to cameraman Justin Lyons after being pierced in the chest by a stingray barb

"C'mon. Let's get this day over and done with."
— Peter Brock, Australian motor racing driver (8 September 2006), to track marshal before dying in race crash

"Grenade. ... It's in the truck."
— Ross A. McGinnis, United States Army soldier and Medal of Honor recipient (4 December 2006), prior to covering grenade with his body to protect the other soldiers in his vehicle

"Lucy."
— Augusto Pinochet, Chilean general and statesman (10 December 2006), calling his wife Lucía Hiriart by his affectionate name for her

"I'm going away tonight."
— James Brown, American musician (25 December 2006), to his manager Charles Bobbit, before dying after falling asleep

"...and Muhammad..."
— Saddam Hussein, fifth President of Iraq (30 December 2006). Saddam recited the Shahada twice as he was executed, dying as he said "and Muhammad" in his second recitation.

"And if I should ever die, God forbid, I hope you will say: 'Kurt is up in heaven now'. That's my favorite joke."
— Kurt Vonnegut, American writer (11 April 2007)

"My address is 130 Green Meadow Lane. Fayetteville Georgia. 30215"
— Chris Benoit, American professional wrestler (24 June 2007), last text message sent to a co-worker before committing murder-suicide.

"Looks like he's gonna try and take another vehicle here, we'll see if they block him in there. Looks like they've got him blocked in there but he did get -"
— Scott Bowerbank, American helicopter pilot for television station KTVK (27 July 2007), describing police pursuit before Phoenix news helicopter collision killed all four people aboard both helicopters.

"Don't kill me."
— Chauncey Bailey, American journalist (2 August 2007), to his murderer, Devaughndre Brousard

 "You be good, I love you. See you tomorrow."
— Alex the African grey parrot (6 September 2007)

"Two words, I do."
— Daryl Holton, American convicted child murderer (12 September 2007), prior to execution by electrocution

"Long live Bhutto."
()
— Benazir Bhutto, Prime Minister of Pakistan (27 December 2007), immediately prior to assassination

"Katie, Katie, look, it'll be fine, you know, I just need to get some sleep."
— Heath Ledger, Australian actor (22 January 2008), on the phone to his sister before accidentally taking a lethal cocktail of prescription medications

"Tape Seinfeld for me."
— Harvey Korman, American actor and comedian (29 May 2008)

"I guess my flying days are over."
— Johnny Miller, American aviation pioneer (23 June 2008), to his nephew while dying at the age of 102. Miller made his final flight at the age of 101.

"I am in debt to so many people. I have caused too great a burden to be placed upon them. I can't begin to fathom the countless agonies down the road. The rest of my life would only be a burden for others. I am unable to do anything because of poor health. I can't read, I can't write. Do not be too sad. Isn't life and death all a part of nature? Do not be sorry. Do not feel resentment toward anyone. It is fate. Cremate me. And leave only a small tombstone near home. I've thought on this for a long time."
()
— Roh Moo-hyun, 9th President of South Korea (23 May 2009), on his suicide note, before jumping from a cliff behind his home in Bongha Village

"More milk."
— Michael Jackson, American musician (25 June 2009), asking his doctor for more propofol shortly before he died from an overdose of the same drug

"Say goodnight to your mother if she's still awake."
— Edward Kenna , last living Australian Second World War recipient of the Victoria Cross (8 July 2009), to his daughter before dying in the same nursing home where his wife lived.

"Take care of each other."
— Corazon Aquino, President of the Philippines (1 August 2009), to her family

"I love you."
— Patrick Swayze, American actor (14 September 2009), to his wife Lisa Niemi

"I'm the happiest man in the world. I've just summited a beautiful mountain."
— Clifton Maloney, American businessman (25 September 2009), prior to falling asleep and not waking up at Camp 2 on Cho Oyu

"Are you ready?"
— Michael Patrick Scusa, United States Army sergeant (3 October 2009), prior to being shot in the neck at the Battle of Kamdesh in Afghanistan

2010–2019
"Mom, I hope you have a good day at work and I love you very much. Love, Jennifer."
— Jennifer Daugherty, American mentally handicapped woman who was tortured to death (11 February 2010), note written to her mother

"Thank you all for the outpouring of support during my latest bout with cancer. It's true that my cancer is serious, but all cancer is serious. If there is such a thing as a good time for this to happen, then this is it. Physically and mentally, I am in great shape. I am a vegetarian; I exercise and have been clean and sober for 25 years. This combined with the very best medical treatments available I am looking forward to the future. All I ask is for everyone to please remain positive, keep your prayers and warm thoughts coming and together we can remain strong. You all have a special place in my heart and I can't wait to meet you all and thank you in person. Love, Doug Fieger."
— Doug Fieger, American musician (14 February 2010) writing his last message on The Knack's website

"Thanks for your help. Have a great day."
— Andrew Joseph Stack III, American embedded software developer (18 February 2010), to air traffic control shortly before intentionally crashing his plane into an office building in Austin, Texas

"I'd like to say 'thank you' to my family for being here and all of my friends. Boomer Sooner."
— Jeffrey Landrigan, American convicted murderer (26 October 2010), prior to execution by lethal injection

"Stopping for a beer, be there when I can."
— Ryan Dunn, American stunt performer (20 June 2011), last text to Bam Margera prior to fatal car crash

"I don't want to die."
— Amy Winehouse, English singer and songwriter (23 July 2011)

"Oh wow. Oh wow. Oh wow."
— Steve Jobs, American electronics businessman (5 October 2011), looking at his family

"I'm ready to go for this thing; we can win this thing."
— Dan Wheldon, British motor racing driver (16 October 2011), last radio transmission before fatal crash at the 2011 IZOD IndyCar World Championship

"Capitalism... Downfall."
— Christopher Hitchens, English-American author, to his agent Steven Wasserman (15 December 2011)

"I'm gonna go see Jesus, want to see Jesus."
— Whitney Houston, American musician (11 February 2012)

"I called you a putz cause I thought you  intentionally disingenuous. If not I apologize.@CenLamar @dust92"
— Andrew Breitbart, American conservative publisher and writer (1 March 2012), final tweet before dying of heart attack

"I love you"
— Taruni Sachdev, Indian child actress and model (14 May 2012), final text to best friend before dying in 2012 Agni Air Dornier 228 crash

"Save me."
— Shriya Shah-Klorfine, Nepali-Canadian woman (19 May 2012), while dying on Mount Everest

"Aloha"
— Daniel Inouye, American lawyer and politician (17 December 2012)

"Well, I hope Percy ain't going to forget to wet the sponge. Put me on the highway to Jackson and call my Irish buddies. . God bless."
— Robert Gleason, American serial killer (16 January 2013)

"I don't want to die, please don't let me die."
()
— Hugo Chávez, Venezuelan statesman (5 March 2013), whispering unable to speak

"Be not afraid."
()
— Seamus Heaney, Irish poet (30 August 2013), final text to his wife

"Get to a safe place. Something really bad might happen."
— Michael Landsberry, teacher, Marine, victim of the Sparks Middle School shooting (21 October 2013), while attempting to disarm the shooter.

"Hey, let's go for a drive."
— Paul Walker, American actor (30 November 2013), prior to dying with his friend Roger Rodas in crash of Porsche Carrera GT

"Good night, Malaysian three seven zero."
— Captain Zaharie Ahmad Shah (8 March 2014), pilot of Malaysia Airlines Flight 370; final transmission before plane's disappearance

"You are the Ultimate Warrior fans and the spirit of Ultimate Warrior will run forever."
— The Ultimate Warrior, American professional wrestler (7 April 2014), in his last public appearance.

"You've forced me to suffer all my life and now I'll force you all suffer. I've waited a long time for this. I'll give you exactly what you deserve. All of you. All you girls who rejected me and looked down upon me and you know, treated me like scum while you gave yourselves to other men. And all of you men, for living a better life than me, all of you sexually active men, I hate you. I hate all of you. I can't wait to give you exactly what you deserve. Utter annihilation."
— Elliot Rodger, American incel mass shooter (23 May 2014), final statement in video titled "Elliot Rodger's Retribution", recorded the day before carrying out the 2014 Isla Vista killings.

"I can't breathe. I can't breathe. I can't breathe. I can't breathe. I can't breathe. I can't breathe. I can't breathe. I can't breathe. I can't breathe. I can't breathe. I can't breathe."
— Eric Garner, American former horticulturist (17 July 2014), after being put in a chokehold by an arresting NYPD officer

"Goodnight, my love."
— Robin Williams, American actor and comedian (11 August 2014), to his wife Susan Schneider, prior to committing suicide

"Remember me as a revolutionary communist."
— Leslie Feinberg, American butch lesbian, transgender activist, communist, and author (15 November 2014)

"Pitch up."
— Michael Alsbury, American commercial astronaut (31 October 2014), prior to death in VSS Enterprise crash

"@ChavesRGB Here I am. A hug, with love from your friend: Chespirito."
()
— Chespirito (Roberto Gómez Bolaños), Mexican comedian, screenwriter, actor, and director (28 November 2014), final tweet, responding to a Brazilian fan club account

"Excuse me."
— Mango, Italian singer-songwriter and musician (8 December 2014), raising an arm to the audience before collapsing from a heart attack during a performance

"I extend my condolences to the Dinkheller family, especially Kyle's parents and his wife and his two children."
— Andrew Howard Brannan, American murderer (13 January 2015), prior to being executed for the murder of Kyle Dinkheller

"My body is on fire. No one should go through this... They poked me five times. It feels like acid."
— Charles Frederick Warner, American child rapist and murderer (15 January 2015), during execution by lethal injection. A grand jury report would later reveal that the state of Oklahoma had obtained the wrong drugs for his execution.

"A life is like a garden. Perfect moments can be had, but not preserved, except in memory. LLAP"
— Leonard Nimoy, American actor, filmmaker and photographer (27 February 2015), final tweet

"...and I love you Sally. And I love you Susan. You let my kids know I went out singing Amazing Grace. And tell the Gissendaner family I am so sorry. That amazing man lost his life because of me and if I could take it back, if this would change it, I would have done it a long time ago. But it's not. And I just hope they can find peace. And I hope they find some happiness. God bless you."
— Kelly Gissendaner, American murder convict (30 September 2015), final statement prior to execution.

"On me."
— Joshua Wheeler, United States Army soldier assigned to the Delta Force (22 October 2015), prior to being killed in action during Operation Inherent Resolve

"Music has been my doorway of perception and the house that I live in."
— David Bowie, English singer-songwriter and actor (10 January 2016), to his friend Gary Oldman

"Everything's going to be all right, old boy."
— Terry Wogan, Irish radio and television broadcaster (31 January 2016), to a priest who visited him

"I love you."
— Joey Feek, American country music singer and songwriter (4 March 2016), to her husband, Rory Feek

"They are outside. This is the end, commander. Thank you, tell my family and my country I love them. Tell them I was brave and fought until I could no longer. Please, take care of my family, avenge my death. Goodbye commander, tell my family I love them!"
— Alexander Prokhorenko, Russian Armed Forces soldier who called an airstrike on his own position as he ran out of ammunition in a fight against ISIS fighters during the Palmyra offensive (March 2016)

"No, my pain is too much, Fazila."
— Jo Cox, British Member of Parliament (16 June 2016); to her assistant, Fazila Aswat, who tried to help her stand after she was fatally shot and stabbed

"Thank you."
— Bud Spencer, Italian actor and professional swimmer (27 June 2016), to his family

"Begone Satan."
()
— Jacques Hamel, French Catholic priest (26 July 2016)

"I know, Dad."
— Caleb Schwab, 10-year-old son of Kansas state representative Scott Schwab (7 August 2016), in response to his father telling him "Brothers stick together" before Caleb and his brother rode the Verrückt water slide. Caleb was decapitated by a metal support of the ride's netting.

"I miss her so much, I want to be with Carrie."
— Debbie Reynolds, American actress and singer (28 December 2016), before dying of intracerebral hemorrhage one day after the death of her daughter, Carrie Fisher

"Tell everyone on this train I love them."
— Taliesin Myrddin Namkai-Meche after being fatally stabbed by Jeremy Joseph Christian in the 2017 Portland train attack (26 May 2017)

"Death is so boring. So slow. One only waits for it."
— Robert Elsie, Canadian-born German Albanologist (2 October 2017)

"There are crooks everywhere now. The situation is desperate."
()
— Daphne Caruana Galizia, Maltese journalist (16 October 2017); last words written before her death in car bombing

"Judges! Slobodan Praljak is not a war criminal, with disdain, I reject this verdict. I have taken poison."
()
— Slobodan Praljak, Croatian general (29 November 2017), during the pronouncement of the appeal judgment against him at the ICTY

"Where is your warrant? Not on the dead pig. I need a sheriff, no warrant."
– Matthew Riehl, American murderer and soldier (31 December 2017), shortly before his death by police gunfire after shooting and killing a deputy

"Remember to look up at the stars and not down at your feet."
— Stephen Hawking, English physicist, cosmologist, and author (14 March 2018), in his book, Brief Answers to the Big Questions

"Oh, it’s taking rather a long time."
— David Goodall, English-born Australian botanist and ecologist (10 May 2018), dying by assisted suicide at the age of 104

"I wouldn't know how to land it – I wasn't really planning on landing it."
— Richard Russell, American airport worker (10 August 2018), before crashing a Bombardier Dash 8-Q400 into an island in Washington

"It's good to be king. Wait, maybe. I think maybe I'm just like a little bizarre little person who walks back and forth. Whatever, you know, but..."
— Terry A. Davis, American programmer (11 August 2018), in his last video, "Terry Davis: Rises to Throne"

"Let's rock."
— Edmund Zagorski, American convicted murderer (1 November 2018), prior to execution by electrocution

"God bless. Take care of my boy, Roy."
— Stan Lee, American comic book writer and publisher (12 November 2018)

"I love you, too."
— George H. W. Bush, president of the United States (30 November 2018), speaking to his son George

"Hello, my brothers, how are you? Boy, I'm tired. I was here in Nantes taking care of things, things, things, things, things, things, and it never stops, it never stops, it never stops. Anyway guys, I'm up in this plane that feels like it's falling to pieces, and I'm going to Cardiff. [It's] crazy, we start tomorrow. Training in the afternoon, guys, in my new team... Let's see what happens. So, how's it going with you guys, all good? If in an hour and a half you have no news from me, I don't know if they are going to send someone to look for me because they cannot find me, but you will know... Man, I'm scared!"
()
— Emiliano Sala, Argentine footballer (21 January 2019), last WhatsApp message sent to friends before his death in a plane crash

"Reiwa is beautiful."
()
— Wowaka, Japanese musician (1 April 2019), final tweet, four days before dying of heart failure

"As no document mentions me and no indication or evidence reaches me, they only have SPECULATION or invent intermediaries. I never sold myself and it's proven."
()
— Alan García, Peruvian statesman (17 April 2019), final tweet, one day before committing suicide

"I mean, hey, two wrongs don't make a right, you know..."
— Etika, American YouTuber, streamer and model ( 19 June 2019), in his last video, "I'm Sorry"

"I can't fix myself."
— Elijah McClain, American massage therapist (24 August 2019), after being put in a chokehold by an arresting Aurora, Colorado police officer

2020–2023
"I'm suffocating. I'm suffocating. I'm suffocating. I'm suffocating. I'm suffocating. I'm suffocating. I'm suffocating."
— Cédric Chouviat, French deliveryman (5 January 2020), dying while restrained by Paris police
"I love you. Hold on." 
— Kobe Bryant, American basketball player (26 January 2020), just seconds before the 2020 Calabasas helicopter crash with his daughter, Gianna. 

"Mike can get it done."
— Kirk Douglas, American actor (5 February 2020), expressing his support for the Michael Bloomberg 2020 presidential campaign

"Save my son."— Shad Gaspard, American professional wrestler (17 May 2020), minutes before drowning in Venice Beach

"Nearly 100 frank opinions every day. I couldn't deny they hurt me. "Die", "you are disgusting", "you should disappear" I believed these things about myself more than they did. Thank you, Mother, for the gift of life. My whole life I wanted to be loved. Thank you to everyone who supported me. I love you all. I'm sorry for being weak."
— Hana Kimura, Japanese professional wrestler (23 May 2020), last tweet before committing suicide

"My stomach hurts, my neck hurts, everything hurts ... Man, I can't breathe."
— George Floyd, American former restaurant security guard (25 May 2020), as Minneapolis Police Officer Derek Chauvin knelt on his neck for over nine minutes, asphyxiating him. Chauvin was later convicted for murdering Floyd.

"I, Ennio Morricone, am dead. So I announce it to all the friends who have always been close to me and also to those who are a little far away and I greet them with great affection. Impossible to name them all. But a special memory is for Peppuccio and Roberta, fraternal friends very present in the last years of our life. There is only one reason that drives me to greet everyone like this and to have a funeral in private; I don't want to disturb. I warmly greet Ines, Laura, Sara, Enzo and Norbert, for having shared a large part of my life with me and my family. I want to remember my sisters Adriana, Maria, Franca and their loved ones with love and let them know how much I loved them. A full, intense and profound greeting to my children Marco, Alessandra, Andrea, Giovanni, my daughter-in-law Monica, and to my grandchildren Francesca, Valentina, Francesco and Luca. I hope they understand how much I loved them. Last but not least, Maria. I renew to you the extraordinary love that has held us together and that I am sorry to abandon. The most painful farewell to you"
()
— Ennio Morricone, Italian composer and conductor (6 July 2020), writing his final obituary before dying in hospital

"Help!"
— Naya Rivera, American actress, singer and model (8 July 2020). Shortly after jumping into Lake Piru to go swimming with her son, she told him to get back onto their boat. She helped him back onto the boat; moments later she yelled "Help", with her arm in the air. However, she disappeared into the water.

"It broke me, man, but we need to do that for them. People deserve abundant life, special moments. They've been through hell battling disease. If we were able to ease their suffering and bring joy for a moment, and hopefully moments (as) he goes through the bags, then we made a difference in his life."
— Chadwick Boseman, American actor (28 August 2020), his final text to a producer about sending a personalized message to a fan through the Make-A-Wish Foundation.

"Hey guys, I guess that's it."
— Ronnie McNutt, Iraq War veteran (31 August 2020), on Facebook livestream seconds before pressing a single-shot rifle to his chin and pulling the trigger.

 "My most fervent wish is that I will not be replaced until a new president is installed."
— Ruth Bader Ginsburg, Associate Justice of the United States Supreme Court (18 September 2020), dictated to her granddaughter. Despite Ginsburg's wishes, Amy Coney Barrett was nominated to the Supreme Court on September 26 by President Donald Trump and confirmed by the Senate on October 26, while early and mail-in voting was under way for the 2020 U.S. Presidential Election.

"I ask you to blame the Russian Federation for my death."
()
— Irina Slavina, Russian journalist (2 October 2020), last post on Facebook prior to committing suicide by self-immolation

"We messed up. We let our guard down. Please tell everybody to be careful. This is real, and if you get diagnosed, get help immediately."
— Larry Dean Dixon, American politician, Alabama State Senator (4 December 2020), dying of COVID-19

"I love you. Take care of the boys."
— Larry King, American talk show host (23 January 2021), to his estranged wife, Shawn Southwick

"We've got to get it together for the kids. I want you to be more a part of their lives and take the time. Tashera, my words have always fell on deaf ears and God put me here for the world, so my voice will be stronger when I'm gone."
— DMX, American rapper and actor (9 April 2021), talking to his ex-wife Tashera.

"Well, I've got to be alive for it, haven't I?" 
— Prince Philip, Duke of Edinburgh and Prince Consort to Elizabeth II (9 April 2021), talking to son, then Prince of Wales, Prince Charles, about Phillip's 100th birthday, which would have taken place 2 months and 1 day after his death

"For what, am I in trouble?"
— Daunte Wright, American man killed in police shooting (11 April 2021), when asked to step out of his car by police

"I hope that I can be with Applejack in the afterlife, my life has no meaning without her. If there's no afterlife and she isn't real then my life never mattered anyway."
— Brandon Hole, American brony (15 April 2021), last post on Facebook, less than an hour before carrying out the Indianapolis FedEx shooting which killed 9 people including himself.

"Dear Team, well my time has come. I am eager to rejoin Joan and Eleanor. Before I Go I wanted to let you know how much you mean to me. Never has a public servant had a better group of people working at their side! Together we have accomplished so much and I know you will keep up the good fight. Joe in the White House certainly helps. I always knew it would be okay if I arrived some place and was greeted by one of you! My best to all of you!"
— Walter Mondale, American politician, former vice president of the United States (19 April 2021), final message to his staff

"I love you too."
— Edwin Edwards, American politician, former governor of Louisiana (12 July 2021) responding to his son, Eli Edwards.

"That was no good. That was no good at all."
— Halyna Hutchins, Ukrainian cinematographer (21 October 2021), after being mortally wounded by an accidental gunshot on the set of Rust

"You shot me."
— Otis Anderson Jr., American football player (29 November 2021), responding to his father after the latter fatally shot him

"Allen."
— Betty White, American actress (31 December 2021)

"Hello everyone, Technoblade here. If you're watching this, I am dead. So let's sit down and have one final chat. My real name is Alex. I had one of my siblings call me Dave one time in a deleted video from 2016 and it was one of the most successful pranks we've ever done. Thousands of creepy online dudes trying to get overly personal going, "Oh hey Dave, how's it going?" Sorry for selling out so much in the past year, but thanks to everyone that bought hoodies, plushies and channel memberships. My siblings are going to college! Well if they want to, I don't wanna put any dead brother peer pressure on them. But that's all from me. Thank you all for supporting my content over the years. If I had another hundred lives, I think I would choose to be Technoblade again every single time, as those were the happiest years of my life. I hope you guys enjoyed my content and that I made some of you laugh. And I hope you all go on to live long, prosperous and happy lives, because I love you guys. Technoblade out."
— Technoblade, American YouTuber and internet personality (30 June 2022), written as part of his final message on his father's laptop, eight hours before his death from stage IV metastatic sarcoma. The message was read out by his father in a video titled "so long nerds".

"I'm not afraid. I've done more in my life that I could have ever imagined."
— Olivia Newton-John, Australian singer and actress (8 August 2022), responding to her niece Tottie Goldsmith asking if she was afraid of dying.

"I would like to extend my condolences to those who have lost loved ones in the attacks that occurred this past weekend in Saskatchewan. My thoughts and prayers are with those recovering from injuries, and grieving such horrific losses. I mourn with all Canadians at this tragic time."
— Elizabeth II, Queen of the United Kingdom (8 September 2022), in her final public statement.

"Glory to Ukraine."
()
— Oleksandr Matsievskyi, member of the Ukrainian Ground Forces (30 December 2022), right before being executed by the Russian soldiers during the Battle of Bakhmut

"Jesus, I love you."
()
— Pope Benedict XVI, former head of the Catholic Church (31 December 2022)

"Mama."
— Tyre Nichols, American FedEx worker (10 January 2023), as he was beaten by police. He died three days later from his injuries.

"Fuck you, motherfucker."
— Richard Belzer, American actor (19 February 2023), last words according to Bill Scheft

"I know I hurt people when I was young. I really messed up. But I know Ron DeSantis has done a lot worse. He’s taken a lot from a lot of people. I speak for all men, women and children. He’s put his foot on our necks. Ron DeSantis and other people like him can suck our dicks."
— Donald Dillbeck, American murderer (23 February 2023), executed by lethal injection

Notes

References

External links

Death-related lists

Quotations